Chełmicko  is a village in the administrative district of Gmina Przytoczna, within Międzyrzecz County, Lubusz Voivodeship, in western Poland.

The village has a population of 20.

References

Villages in Międzyrzecz County